The 1890 Buffalo Bisons baseball team was a member of the short lived Players' League, and an "outlaw" franchise that used the name of the existing minor league Buffalo Bisons without permission. The Players’ League Buffalo Bisons compiled a 36–96 record, which landed them in last place, 46½ games behind the pennant-winning Boston Reds and 20 games behind the seventh-place Cleveland Infants in the eight-team league. After the season, the league folded, as did the team.

Regular season

Season standings

Record vs. opponents

Opening Day lineup

Roster

Brooklyn vs Buffalo game and the story of Lewis 

A player known only as "Lewis" made his only MLB appearance in a game on July 12, 1890 against the Brooklyn Ward's Wonders. Born in Brooklyn, New York, Lewis, according to Macht, was a "local boy" who stated he was a pitcher and asked for a tryout when Buffalo played against the Ward's Wonders on July 12, 1890, at Eastern Park in Brooklyn. Bisons player–manager Jack Rowe started Lewis on the mound.

Lewis probably pitched in the top of the first, second, and third innings of the Bisons' game on July 12, during which he allowed 20 earned runs over three innings pitched for an ERA of 60.00. After the third inning, he moved to left field and left fielder Ed Beecher switched to pitcher. In the third inning Lou Bierbauer hit two home runs off Lewis's pitching; this was only the second time a batter in a major league game had hit two home runs in a single inning. Lewis did manage to record at least one strikeout as a pitcher. Defensively, Lewis recorded two putouts and three assists on five total chances as a pitcher, with no putouts or assists on no chances as a left fielder. As a batter, Lewis recorded one hit over five at bats for a batting average of .200, and scored a run. Lewis is credited with only two innings played in the outfield, though several box scores only list nine players as having played for Buffalo in the game, the game as lasting nine innings, and Lewis as having played only in left field and as a pitcher. A July 13, 1890 article in the Brooklyn Daily Eagle described Beecher as an "improvement" over Lewis as a pitcher, but Sporting Life notes on the game say Beecher "fared but little better".

Brooklyn won the game 28–16. The total of 44 runs set a record for the most combined runs scored in a single MLB game which stood until 1922. Lewis recorded a loss for his dismal performance. According to a box score in The New York Times, 600 people attended the game, compared to attendances of 2,156 for a PL game in Boston, 2,508 for a PL game in Philadelphia, and 4,304 for a PL game in New York. The game in which Lewis played lasted two hours and three minutes, according to The New York Times; Lon Knight and Charley Jones served as umpires. The wind during the game was described as "chilly", with "awfully stiff" winds blowing in from Jamaica Bay and fans "shiveringly [clinging] to their seats".

Several articles recounted Lewis's performance in the game. A contemporary writer for The Pittsburgh Press described Lewis's tryout as a "disastrous experiment" and called the game "one of the greatest slugging matches ever seen since curve pitching came into vogue", while Sporting Life reported that "[t]he Buffalos tried a new pitcher named Lewis in the box, but after three innings he retired to left field, a much disgusted ball tosser." The Brooklyn Daily Eagle said that "the way [Ward's Wonders] pounded Lewis' delivery must have convinced that aspirant for fame that the [P]layers' [L]eague [was] above his class", and described him as "unfortunate". Other contemporary papers covered the game: the Buffalo Courier said Lewis was "slaughtered"; the New-York Tribune called him a "failure"; and the St. Louis Post-Dispatch said the game was "full of accidents", though "Lewis was used worse than all the rest, as he was knocked completely out of the box".

Lewis did not make another appearance for the Bisons during the rest of the season, and his first name, date of birth, date of death, and batting and pitching stances were unknown , though a writer for The Pittsburgh Press described Lewis as a "young man" when he played for the team. The Brooklyn Daily Eagle used the performance to argue that Buffalo should ask other clubs to borrow pitchers for the team. 

Lewis's ERA is given as 60.00, by allowing 20 earned runs in three innings, but there is a problem with this. Since Buffalo committed eight errors that day (Brooklyn was even less astute in the field, with eleven miscues) it seems unlikely that all 20 of the runs Lewis allowed were earned; and one look at the boxscore (q.v.) reveals this to be impossible. Only fourteen of the 28 runs Brooklyn scored are credited as earned, so at least six (and potentially as many as fourteen) of the scores allowed by the unfortunate Lewis had to be unearned. This places Lewis' true ERA somewhere between 18.00 and 42.00, not 60.00 (that and his WHIP rate of 6.667 would be both the highest on the Bisons and the highest in the history of the PL). Lewis does not hold the MLB single-season highest ERA record among non-qualifiers, which is infinity. (If not Lewis, the current MLB record for the highest ERA with at least three innings pitched is 30.00 by Dave Davidson, who gave up ten earned runs in three innings from 2007-09.) Lewis is not listed as having played in any other major or minor-league games.

Player stats

Batting

Starters by position 
Note: Pos = Position; G = Games played; AB = At bats; H = Hits; Avg. = Batting average; HR = Home runs; RBI = Runs batted in

Other batters 
Note: G = Games played; AB = At bats; H = Hits; Avg. = Batting average; HR = Home runs; RBI = Runs batted in

Pitching

Starting pitchers 
Note: G = Games pitched; IP = Innings pitched; W = Wins; L = Losses; ERA = Earned run average; SO = Strikeouts

Other pitchers 
Note: G = Games pitched; IP = Innings pitched; W = Wins; L = Losses; ERA = Earned run average; SO = Strikeouts

Relief pitchers 
Note: G = Games pitched; W = Wins; L = Losses; SV = Saves; ERA = Earned run average; SO = Strikeouts

Notes

References 

 1890 Buffalo Bisons team page at Baseball Reference

Buffalo Bisons season